The Regional Council of Franche-Comté was the regional council of Franche-Comté (France). It was chaired by Marie-Marguerite Dufay until its merger to form the Regional Council of Bourgogne-Franche-Comté.

Seats

By department
19 councillors for Doubs
10 councillors for Jura
10 councillors for Haute-Saône
4 councillors for Territoire de Belfort

By party

Elections

 2004 Franche-Comté regional election
 2010 Franche-Comté regional election

Former presidents

 List of presidents of the Regional Council of Franche-Comté

Current membership

External links 
 Franche-Comté Regional Council official website

 
Politics of Franche-Comté
Franche-Comte